The U.S. Amateur Public Links Championship, often referred to as the Public Links or the Publinx, was a men's amateur golf tournament, one of 10 individual amateur championships organized by the United States Golf Association. The USGA typically called the event the U.S. Amateur Public Links, which it has registered as a service mark. The tournament was devised as a championship for golfers who played on public courses, as members of private clubs were barred from entry. In February 2013, the USGA announced that the event would be discontinued after its 2014 edition, and would be replaced by a new men's amateur four-ball championship.

The first Public Links was held in 1922 at the Ottawa Park Course in Toledo, Ohio. The event grew over time, from 140 entries in 1922 to over 6,000 in 1998.

The Publinx was created to provide an outlet for national competition for public-course golfers because at that time, entry to the U.S. Amateur was restricted to members of clubs that were affiliated with the USGA or (presumably) other national governing bodies. However, in 1979, entry to the U.S. Amateur was opened to all amateurs, whether or not they were club members. When the USGA announced the demise of the Publinx, it specifically stated that "the APL [Amateur Public Links] and WAPL [Women's Amateur Public Links] championships no longer serve their original mission because of the widespread accessibility public-course golfers today enjoy in USGA championships."

Eligibility was similar to that for the U.S. Amateur. Golfers must follow the USGA's guidelines for amateur status, which, in general, exclude anyone who has ever played or taught golf for money. The Public Links, like the U.S. Amateur, had no age limit. However, there were two key differences in the eligibility criteria for the Public Links:
Entries were accepted from golfers with a USGA men's handicap of 4.4 or lower, as opposed to 2.4 for the U.S. Amateur.
Entries were not accepted from players who have playing privileges at golf clubs not open to the general public, and such golfers were not allowed to compete if they received such privileges between their entry and the end of the main tournament.
Exceptions to above: The USGA did consider some players with privileges at non-public facilities to be "bona fide public course players," specifically those whose privileges were solely due to any of the following:
Their enrollment in a specific educational institution.
Their status as active or retired members of the military.
Their current or former employment by an entity other than a golf club.
The Public Links was open to men and women, although very few women ever entered. In 2005, 15-year-old Michelle Wie became the first woman to advance to the match-play portion of the tournament. She was also the first woman to ever qualify for any USGA championship typically played by men.

Entrants qualified to play in the U.S. Amateur Public Links by playing one of many qualifying tournaments held at sites around the United States with players completing 36 holes of stroke play in one day. The 64 qualifiers played in the tournament proper which began with three rounds of stroke play to narrow the field to 16 players who then competed in a single-elimination match play tournament.  Each match was 18 holes except the championship match which was 36 holes; before 2001, the final was an 18-hole match.

The winner of the event earned an invitation to the following year's Masters Tournament, if he/she was still an amateur at the time of the Masters.

The 2005 edition, held in Lebanon, Ohio, drew an unusually large amount of media attention due to Michelle Wie's presence. She had stated on several occasions that she wished to one day play in the Masters, and this event was generally considered to be her best chance to qualify. Wie advanced to the match play rounds, losing in the quarterfinals to Clay Ogden, who went on to win the tournament.

The equivalent event for women was the U.S. Women's Amateur Public Links, established in 1977 and also discontinued after 2014 and replaced by a women's four-ball tournament.

Trevor Immelman became the first winner of the Public Links to win a Major Championship with his victory at the 2008 Masters Tournament. His playing partner in the final round, Brandt Snedeker, was also a past Public Links winner.

Winners

2014 Byron Meth
2013 Jordan Niebrugge
2012 T. J. Vogel
2011 Corbin Mills
2010 Lion Kim
2009 Brad Benjamin
2008 Jack Newman
2007 Colt Knost
2006 Casey Watabu
2005 Clay Ogden
2004 Ryan Moore
2003 Brandt Snedeker
2002 Ryan Moore
2001 Chez Reavie
2000 D. J. Trahan
1999 Hunter Haas
1998 Trevor Immelman
1997 Tim Clark
1996 Tim Hogarth
1995 Chris Wollmann
1994 Guy Yamamoto
1993 David Berganio Jr.
1992 Warren Schutte
1991 David Berganio Jr.
1990 Michael Combs
1989 Tim Hobby
1988 Ralph Howe III
1987 Kevin Johnson
1986 Billy Mayfair
1985 Jim Sorenson
1984 Bill Malley
1983 Billy Tuten
1982 Billy Tuten
1981 Jodie Mudd
1980 Jodie Mudd
1979 Dennis Walsh
1978 Dean Prince
1977 Jerry Vidovic
1976 Eddie Mudd
1975 Randy Barenaba
1974 Charles Barenaba, Jr.
1973 Stan Stopa
1972 Bob Allard
1971 Fred Haney
1970 Robert Risch
1969 John M. Jackson, Jr.
1968 Gene Towry
1967 Verne Callison
1966 Monty Kaser
1965 Arne Dokka
1964 William McDonald
1963 Robert Lunn
1962 R. H. Sikes
1961 R. H. Sikes
1960 Verne Callison
1959 Bill Wright
1958 Dan Sikes
1957 Don Essig III
1956 James H. Buxbaum
1955 Sam D. Kocsis
1954 Gene Andrews
1953 Ted Richards Jr.
1952 Omer L. Bogan
1951 Dave Stanley
1950 Stanley Bielat
1949 Kenneth J. Towns
1948 Michael R. Ferentz
1947 Wilfred Crossley
1946 Smiley Quick
1942–45 No tournament
1941 William M. Welch, Jr.
1940 Robert C. Clark
1939 Andrew Szwedko
1938 Al Leach
1937 Bruce McCormick
1936 Pat Abbott
1935 Frank Strafaci
1934 David A. Mitchell
1933 Charles Ferrera
1932 R. L. Miller
1931 Charles Ferrera
1930 Robert E. Wingate
1929 Carl F. Kauffmann
1928 Carl F. Kauffmann
1927 Carl F. Kauffmann
1926 Lester Bolstad
1925 Raymond J. McAuliffe
1924 Joseph Coble
1923 Richard J. Walsh
1922 Edmund R. Held

Multiple winners
3 wins: Carl F. Kauffmann
2 wins: David Berganio Jr., Verne Callison, Charles Ferrera, Ryan Moore, Jodie Mudd, R. H. Sikes, Billy Tuten

References

External links
Official site

Amateur golf tournaments in the United States
Amateur Public Links